Franz Horn (26 August 1904 – 22 September 1963) was a German international footballer. He was part of Germany's team at the 1928 Summer Olympics, but he did not play in any matches.

References

1904 births
1963 deaths
Association football forwards
German footballers
Germany international footballers
Olympic footballers of Germany
Footballers at the 1928 Summer Olympics
Hamburger SV players
Footballers from Essen